In organizational studies, resource management is the efficient and effective development of an organization's resources when they are needed. Such resources may include the financial resources, inventory, human skills, production resources, or information technology (IT) and natural resources.

In the realm of project management, processes, techniques and philosophies as to the best approach for allocating resources have been developed.  These include discussions on functional vs. cross-functional resource allocation as well as processes espoused by organizations like the Project Management Institute (PMI) through their Project Management Body of Knowledge (PMBOK) methodology of project management. Resource management is a key element to activity resource estimating and project human resource management. Both are essential components of a comprehensive project management plan to execute and monitor a project successfully. As is the case with the larger discipline of project management, there are resource management software tools available that automate and assist the process of resource allocation to projects and portfolio resource transparency including supply and demand of resources.  The goal of these tools typically is to ensure that: (i) there are employees within our organization with required specific skill set and desired profile required for a project, (ii) decide the number and skill sets of new employees to hire, and (iii) allocate the workforce to various projects. Within professional services and consulting organizations, the effectiveness of these tools and processes is typically monitored by measuring billable utilization rate.

Corporate resource management process 
Large organizations usually have a defined corporate resource management process which mainly guarantees that resources are never over-allocated across multiple projects. Peter Drucker wrote of the need to focus resources, abandoning less promising initiatives for every new project taken on, as fragmentation inhibits results.

Corporate Governance 
While corporate governance is defined within the context of companies operating in a market economy, it does not define corporate governance within the context of other institutions, including local governments, international bodies, or charities. In the latter context, corporate governance is defined as "the system and practices by which organizations are led and managed. For local governments, this includes the policies, procedures, and values that guide their leadership, management, performance, customer satisfaction, community involvement, and responsible use of public funds”.

 Russia:

          There is a relatively detailed exploration of corporate governance in the developed market economies such as the United States, United Kingdom, and Japan, and not enough for the less prominent economies such as Russia. Russian corporations are regarded as operating in an environment of weaker government regulations that protect investor rights. Furthermore, Russian corporate governance is historically seen as having non-optimal systems for external capital infusion into companies. In Russia, there is a high concentration of ownership in companies, particularly by those within the company. These weak legal systems allow for personal gain, underdeveloped capital markets, a divided job market, and a significant government presence in business. Nevertheless, there have been attempts to improve the corporate governance model in Russia since the early 2000s. These efforts have emerged from the recognition that good corporate governance, operating in a well-regulated legal environment, is necessary to advance the development of corporations.

 China:

          The Chinese corporate governance environment is significant. A greater concentration of ownership characterizes Chinese corporate governance compared to the United States. Often, the most prominent stakeholders hold a more significant percentage of the company compared to the United States, thus minimizing the role of managers in corporate decision-making compared to the United States. This ownership structure leads to horizontal agency conflict between majority and minority shareholders, compared to vertical agency problems often characteristic of western corporations. The ownership structure also makes it likely that dominant shareholders may use their power to expropriate wealth from minority shareholders. Furthermore, rapid evolutions also characterize Chinese corporate structure. Since the stock market was allowed in the 1990s, significant shifts have been observed in the corporate legal environment and governance culture of Chinese corporations. For instance, China shifted from a corporate governance model where primary production was conducted by State Owned Enterprises (SOEs) that held all property and managerial rights to where the SOEs were responsible for their own profits or losses.

Techniques 
One resource management technique is resource leveling. It aims at smoothing the stock of resources on hand, reducing both excess inventories and shortages.

The required data are: the demands for various resources, forecast by time period into the future as far as is reasonable, as well as the resources' configurations required in those demands, and the supply of the resources, again forecast by time period into the future as far as is reasonable.

The goal is to achieve 100% utilization but that is very unlikely, when weighted by important metrics and subject to constraints, for example: meeting a minimum service level, but otherwise minimizing cost.  A Project Resource Allocation Matrix (PRAM) is maintained to visualize the resource allocations against various projects.

The principle is to invest in resources as stored capabilities, then unleash the capabilities as demanded.

A dimension of resource development is included in resource management by which investment in resources can be retained by a smaller additional investment to develop a new capability that is demanded, at a lower investment than disposing of the current resource and replacing it with another that has the demanded capability.

In conservation, resource management is a set of practices pertaining to maintaining natural systems integrity.  Examples of this form of management are air resource management, soil conservation, forestry, wildlife management and water resource management.  The broad term for this type of resource management is natural resource management (NRM).

See also 
 Environmental management
 Factor 10
 Holistic management
 Industrial symbiosis
 List of resource management software
 Resource allocation

References 

Nature conservation
Land management
Schedule (project management)
Management by type